David M. Livingston (29 March 1941 – 17 October 2021) was the Deputy Director of the Dana-Farber/Harvard Cancer Center, Emil Frei Professor of Genetics and Medicine at Harvard Medical School, Chairman of the Executive Committee for Research at Dana–Farber Cancer Institute. Dr. Livingston joined the Harvard faculty in 1973. His research focused on breast and ovarian cancer.

He received his undergraduate degree from Harvard College in 1961 and his MD from Tufts Medical School in 1965.

Awards 
2017 Pezcoller Foundation-AACR International Award for Cancer Research
2015 Elected Fellow of the American Association for Cancer Research Academy
2012  Robert J. and Claire Pasarow Foundation Medical Research Award in Cancer Research
2009  Anthony Dipple Carcinogenesis Award, European Association for Cancer Research
2005  AACR-G.H.A Clowes Memorial Award
2005  Theodor Boveri Award, German Cancer Society
2001  Elected Fellow American Academy of Arts and Sciences
1997  Association of American Medical College's Award for Distinguished Research in the Biomedical Sciences, Baxter Allegiance Foundation
1995  Elected Member National Academy of Sciences, Washington, D.C.
1991  Richard P. and Claire W. Morse Scientific Award, Dana–Farber Cancer Institute
1990  Elected Member Institute of Medicine

Laboratory Alumni 
William Kaelin, Nobel Laureate in Physiology or Medicine
William Raj Sellers, Cancer Program Director, Broad Institute; former Head of Global Oncology, Novartis

References 

1941 births
2021 deaths
Harvard University alumni
Fellows of the AACR Academy
Tufts University School of Medicine alumni
American oncologists
Fellows of the American Academy of Arts and Sciences
Members of the National Academy of Medicine
Members of the United States National Academy of Sciences
Fellows of the American Academy of Microbiology